Topolnitsa may refer to the following places in Bulgaria:
 Topolnitsa, Blagoevgrad Province, a village
 Topolnitsa, Kyustendil Province, a village
 Topolnitsa River
 Topolnitsa Reservoir

See also
 Topolnica (disambiguation)